Perumalkoil is a village in the Papanasam taluk of Thanjavur district, Tamil Nadu, India.

Demographics 

As per the 2001 census, Perumalkoil had a total population of 1638 with 787 males and 851 females. The sex ratio was 1081. The literacy rate was 75.56.

References 

 

Villages in Thanjavur district